The 2021 Trofeo de Campeones de la Liga Profesional (officially the Trofeo de Campeones Socios.com 2021 for sponsorship reasons) was the 2nd. edition of the Trofeo de Campeones de la Liga Profesional, an annual football match contested by the winners of Primera División and Copa de la Liga Profesional competitions, similar to the defunct Trofeo de Campeones de la Superliga Argentina.

It was played on 18 December 2021, at the Estadio Único Madre de Ciudades in Santiago del Estero between River Plate and Colón. They qualified after winning the 2021 Primera División and the 2021 Copa de la Liga Profesional, respectively.

River Plate defeated Colón 4–0 to win their first title.

Qualified teams

Match

Details

|style="vertical-align:top; width:50%"|

|}

Statistics

References 

t
t
t